Nadia Falvo (born 4 April 1963) is a former Italian female middle-distance runner who currently holds a national record with the relay national team.

Biography
She won 3 national championships at senior level.

National records
 4x800 metres relay: '8:18.3 ( Sheffield, 5 June 1992) - with Nicoletta Tozzi, Stefania Savi, Fabia Trabaldo - current holder.

National titles
Italian Athletics Championships
800 m: 1992
Italian Athletics Indoor Championships
800 m: 1993, 1992

See aldo
 List of Italian records in athletics

References

External links
 

1963 births
Living people
Italian female middle-distance runners
Mediterranean Games bronze medalists for Italy
Athletes (track and field) at the 1991 Mediterranean Games
Mediterranean Games medalists in athletics
20th-century Italian women
21st-century Italian women